Petrolia is a city in Clay County, Texas, United States. It is part of the Wichita Falls, Texas Metropolitan Statistical Area. The population was 686 at the 2010 census, down from 782 at the 2000 census.

Geography

Petrolia is located in northern Clay County at  (34.013107, –98.231655). Texas State Highway 79 passes through the center of town, leading southwest  to Wichita Falls and northeast  to Waurika, Oklahoma. Texas State Highway 148 leads south from the center of Petrolia  to Henrietta, the Clay County seat.

Demographics

As of the census of 2000, there were 782 people, 305 households, and 215 families residing in the city. The population density was 1,051.1 people per square mile (408.0/km). There were 338 housing units at an average density of 454.3/sq mi (176.4/km). The racial makeup of the city was 94.88% White, 0.77% African American, 1.41% Native American, 1.15% from other races, and 1.79% from two or more races. Hispanic or Latino of any race were 3.96% of the population.

There were 305 households, out of which 32.1% had children under the age of 18 living with them, 53.8% were married couples living together, 13.1% had a female householder with no husband present, and 29.2% were non-families. 26.6% of all households were made up of individuals, and 13.8% had someone living alone who was 65 years of age or older. The average household size was 2.56 and the average family size was 3.07.

In the city, the population was spread out, with 26.9% under the age of 18, 9.5% from 18 to 24, 26.9% from 25 to 44, 22.1% from 45 to 64, and 14.7% who were 65 years of age or older. The median age was 36 years. For every 100 females, there were 77.7 males. For every 100 females age 18 and over, there were 78.2 males.

The median income for a household in the city was $27,386, and the median income for a family was $31,250. Males had a median income of $26,136 versus $16,731 for females. The per capita income for the city was $12,825. About 16.6% of families and 17.6% of the population were below the poverty line, including 20.2% of those under age 18 and 20.5% of those age 65 or over.

Notable people

 Reed Hadley, actor on Racket Squad and The Public Defender; born in Petrolia in 1911
 David Nelson, NFL football player for the New York Jets

Education
The city is served by the Petrolia Independent School District and is home to the Petrolia High School Pirates.

References

External links
  See historic photos of Petrolia from the Clay County Historical Society, hosted by the Portal to Texas History

Cities in Clay County, Texas
Cities in Texas
Wichita Falls metropolitan area